Dolichoderus diversus is a species of ant in the genus Dolichoderus. Described by Emery in 1894, the species has a widespread distribution in multiple countries, including Brazil, Colombia, Costa Rica, Ecuador, Guyana, Mexico, Panama, Trinidad and Tobago and Venezuela.

References

Dolichoderus
Hymenoptera of North America
Hymenoptera of South America
Insects described in 1894